Contraband is a lost 1925 silent film produced by Famous Players-Lasky and distributed by Paramount Pictures. Alan Crosland directed and Lois Wilson stars. The film is taken from a novel, Contraband, by Charles Buddington Kelland. The last film directed by Alan Crosland the cooperation with distributor Paramount Pictures.

Cast
Lois Wilson as Carmel Lee
Noah Beery as Deputy Jenney
Raymond Hatton as Launcelot Bangs
Raymond McKee as Evan B. Pell
Charles Ogle as Sheriff Churchill
Luke Cosgrove as Tubal
Edward Davis as Abner Fownes
Johnny Fox as Simmy
Victor Potel as George Bogardus
Alphonse Ethier as Jared Whitfield
Cesare Gravina as Pee Wee Bangs
Lillian Leighton as Mrs. Churchill

References

External links

1925 films
American silent feature films
Lost American films
Films directed by Alan Crosland
Paramount Pictures films
Films based on American novels
1925 drama films
Silent American drama films
American black-and-white films
1925 lost films
Lost drama films
1920s American films